Nebkaure Khety was an ancient Egyptian pharaoh of the 9th or 10th Dynasty, during the First Intermediate Period.

Reign
Practically nothing is known about the events of Nebkaure's reign; due to the contrasting opinions of scholars, even its datation is still difficult. Many Egyptologists assign Nebkaure to the 9th Dynasty, possibly the fourth king (and the second king bearing the name Khety), just after Neferkare.
On the other hand, other scholars such as Jürgen von Beckerath believe instead that Nebkaure reigned during the subsequent 10th Dynasty, possibly before Meryibre Khety.

Attestations
Like many of the kings who preceded or succeeded him, attestations of Nebkaure Khety are scant. On the Turin King List he was tentatively placed in the register 4.21. The only contemporary object bearing his cartouche is a weight made from red jasper which was unearthed by Flinders Petrie at Tell el-Retabah, a location along the Wadi Tumilat in the eastern Delta; this weight is now exhibited at the Petrie Museum (UC11782).

The name of a king Nebkaure also appears on a late Middle Kingdom papyrus (Berlin 3023) containing part of the well known and popular story The Eloquent Peasant; it is very likely that the king Nebkaure who enjoyed the peasant's magniloquence so much was Nebkaure Khety indeed.

References

External links
 Royal Titulary of Nebkaure Khety on Eglyphica.net (search in the Tenth Dynasty).

22nd-century BC Pharaohs
Pharaohs of the Ninth Dynasty of Egypt
Pharaohs of the Tenth Dynasty of Egypt
Wadi Tumilat